Axel Birger Schlaug (born 29 January 1949 in Stockholm) is a Swedish author, public speaker, blogger and former spokesperson for the Swedish Green Party, Miljöpartiet.

Bibliography
 Berättelsen om Emily från Xinjiang.
Gud älskar att färdas i en rosa Cadillac, en roman om Elvis, rock’n’roll och livet som var, Fischer & Co, Rimbo (2006) 
Svarta oliver och gröna drömmar, Norstedts förlag, Stockholm (1997) 
Kretsloppsekonomi – ekonomi för en hållbar utveckling (with Marianne Samuelsson), Stockholm (1993), Rapport/Miljöpartiet De gröna , 1993:4
Regeringen och miljön (tillsammans med Karin Jönsson), Stockholm (1994), Rapport/Miljöpartiet De gröna , 1994:2
Norden – det naturliga steget inför 2000-talet (tillsammans med Marianne Samuelsson), Stockholm (1993), Rapport/Miljöpartiet De gröna , 1993:3
Unionen och miljön (with Marianne Samuelsson), Stockholm (1993), Rapport/Miljöpartiet De gröna , 1993:1
24 konkreta miljökrav redovisade inför EES-utskottet den 21 augusti 1992 (with Marianne Samuelsson), Stockholm (1992), Rapport/Miljöpartiet De gröna , 1992:6
Sverige som modelland – 10 principer för en hållbar utveckling (tillsammans med Marianne Samuelsson), Stockholm (1992), Rapport/Miljöpartiet De gröna , 1992:2
Elva steg för en robust ekonomi (with Marianne Samuelsson), Stockholm (1992), Rapport/Miljöpartiet De gröna , 1992:4
Miljön, makten och friheten. Studieplan, Gröna böcker, Lund (1990)
Miljön, makten och friheten, Gidlunds förlag, Stockholm (1990)

External links

Birger Schlaugs blogg, Birger Schlaug skriver om miljön, makten och friheten. Och lite musik.

References

Green Party (Sweden) politicians
Members of the Riksdag
20th-century Swedish novelists
20th-century Swedish politicians
21st-century Swedish politicians
Swedish male novelists
People associated with criticism of economic growth
1949 births
Living people
21st-century Swedish novelists